Love at Sea is a 1936 British comedy film directed by Adrian Brunel and starring Rosalyn Boulter, Carl Harbord and Aubrey Mallalieu. During production a major fire broke out at British and Dominions Elstree Studios where the film was being shot. Brunel moved production to the nearby Rock Studios and managed to complete the film on time. The screenplay concerns a woman travelling on a cruise ship who falls in love with a suspected thief on board.

Main cast
 Rosalyn Boulter as Betty Foster
 Carl Harbord as Dick Holmes
 Aubrey Mallalieu as John Brighton
 Frank Birch as Mr. Godwin
 Dorothy Dewhurst as Mrs. Hackworth Pratt
 Maud Gill as Emily Foster
 Beatrix Fielden-Kaye as Katherine Foster
 Billy Bray as Slippery Joe
 George Merritt as Inspector

References

Bibliography
 Chibnall, Steve. Quota Quickies: The Birth of the British 'B' film. British Film Institute, 2007.
 Low, Rachael. History of the British Film: Filmmaking in 1930s Britain. George Allen & Unwin, 1985 .

External links

1936 films
1936 comedy films
British comedy films
Films directed by Adrian Brunel
Seafaring films
British black-and-white films
1930s English-language films
1930s British films